The BMO Centre is the largest convention centre in Calgary, Alberta. It is located in Stampede Park, which is in the Beltline district south of downtown Calgary.  The BMO Centre was previously known as the Round-up Centre. 

In March 2016, the Calgary Stampede organization announced plans to demolish the adjacent Stampede Corral to make way for a $500 million expansion of the BMO Centre.

See also
List of attractions and landmarks in Calgary
Trade fair

References

Bank of Montreal
Buildings and structures in Calgary
Convention centres in Canada